Zar (also Tzar) is a village in the Kalbajar District of Azerbaijan.

Etymology 

Armenian architectural historian Samvel Karapetyan writes that the settlement was first mentioned as "Tsar" in 1289. In the records of Dadivank Monastery in 1763, it is referred to as Mets Tsar, and in the 18th century, with an increased nomadic presence in the region, Zar, a derivative of Tsar, began to be used as a name for the village.

An Azerbaijani legend suggests a different origin. A poor young man named Zaza once lived in this village. He was in love with a girl named Nazı, but her parents were against their relationship. Zaza then decided to seek assistance from Nadir Shah. He planted a watermelon in a narrow-necked jar. The surprised shah approved and ordered that Nazı be given to Zaza. However, as soon as Nadir Shah left town, Nazı's family went to Zaza's house and murdered him before throwing his body into a well. Zaza's mother cried for several days after that. The name Zar was said to have derived from this legend as the Azerbaijani word "zarıldamaq" translates as "to sob".

History 
The history of the village goes back to the early medieval period, when it was the administrative center of the Kingdom of Artsakh's canton of Tsar. Until the 11th to 12th centuries, the village went by the name of Vaykunik. In 1250, a sectarian peasant movement was recorded to have taken place in the village of Tsar in Armenia.

In the 12th and 13th centuries, the Armenian Dopian dynasty, closely related to the Zakarids, established itself in Tsar. During the invasions of Timur in the 14th century, the population of the region of Tsar was almost totally massacred. However, the Dopian principality survived, with the region of Tsar coming to serve as a stronghold and refuge for Armenian refugees from regional conflicts. In the late 16th century, Tsar came under Persian rule, with the Dopian meliks preserving their titles as the rulers of the Melikdom of Tsar, legitimized by an edict in 1603 by Shah Abbas. In the late 17th century, the melikdom of Tsar was incorporated into the melikdoms of Jraberd and Sotk. In the middle of the 18th century, Armenian historian Yesai Hasan-Jalalyan of the princely Hasan-Jalalyan family, states that:

Beginning in 1724, an exodus of the Armenian population of the region took place. From the late 18th century and onwards, there was an increased Turkish and Kurdish nomadic presence in the region. In the early 19th century, the village was destroyed by the armies of the Ottoman Empire. Archbishop and scholar Makar Barkhutariants visited Tsar in 1880, noting the many remaining tombs and khachkars around the village, with many having being broken and inscriptions having been erased. The cathedral (or "large temple") in the centre of the village was still largely preserved at this time, with a khachkar on its walls with an inscription that read "I Melik, and my god-son Akutin, and my brother Mkhitar erected this cross in year 1225".

Two of the four churches of Tsar of as well as two nearby monasteries have been destroyed. Armenian churches, monasteries and cemeteries in the village started to be destroyed by Kurds at the end of the 19th century, and the destruction continued on a larger scale during the Soviet period, especially during the 1940s and 1950s. The monastery of Getamijo (also known as the monastery of Tsara, as well as Getamijo Surb Astvatsatsin) was consecrated in 1301 and stood at the edge of Tsar. Stones from the church were used to build a school in the village in the 1950s, with 133 carved or inscribed stone fragments reused within the walls of the school.

The village was located in the Armenian-occupied territories surrounding Nagorno-Karabakh, coming under the control of ethnic Armenian forces during the First Nagorno-Karabakh War in the early 1990s. The village subsequently became part of the breakaway Republic of Artsakh as part of its Shahumyan Province. The village was handed over to Azerbaijan on 25 November 2020 as part of the 2020 Nagorno-Karabakh ceasefire agreement.

Historical heritage sites 
Historical heritage sites in and around the village include medieval tombstones, khachkars from between the 12th and 17th centuries, a 12th/13th-century castle and chapel, the church of Surb Grigor consecrated in 1274, the church of Surb Sargis consecrated in 1279, a 13th-century bridge, and the 17th-century church of Surb Astvatsatsin.

Demographics 
The village had 52 inhabitants in 2005, and 83 inhabitants in 2015.

Gallery

See also 
 Monastery of Tsar
 Yovanisik Caretsi

References

Further reading 
  Ulubabyan, Bagrat. Khacheni ishkhanutyune, x-xvi darerum [The Principality of Khachen in the 10th to 16th centuries]. Yerevan: Armenian Academy of Sciences, 1975.

External links 

 

Populated places in Kalbajar District